LaToya "Toya" Martin (born LaToya Lacole Rodriguez; July 22, 1983), better known by her mononym, Toya, is an American R&B singer from St. Louis, Missouri, best known for her 2001 song, "I Do!!", which reached number 16 on the U.S. Billboard Hot 100.

Early life and education
Toya was born LaToya Lacole Rodriguez on July 22, 1983, to a Puerto Rican father and an African American mother. She was named after La Toya Jackson. She graduated from Mary Institute and St. Louis Country Day School in St. Louis County, Missouri.

Career
Toya’s career jump started when Courtney Benson and Tony Davis signed Toya to their production company, Hit City Music Group. The two also managed another St. Louis native, Hip Hop superstar Nelly. They took Toya to Arista Records, where then-label chief L.A. Reid signed her to a major record deal instantly. Toya’s first single "I Do!!" had major chart success. And led to her self-titled debut album later that same year, which landed on the Billboard 200. Her second single was 2002's "No Matta What (Party All Night)".

In January 2011, Toya announced via Twitter that she would like to record music again. In April 2013, she stated that she was attempting to record music again.

Personal life
Toya is married to Tamaurice "Tee" Martin, the wide receivers coach for the Baltimore Ravens. On March 15, 2004, their son Kaden Martin was born. In 2012, Toya gave birth to a second child, another son Cannon, according to her via Twitter.

Discography

Albums
 2001: Toya — US #109

Singles

Other appearances
"Stick Out Ya Wrist" (with Nelly), from the XXX soundtrack (2002)
"Same Ol Dirty" (with Murphy Lee), from Murphy's Law (2004)
"I Had A Dream" (with Terror Time), from Hard Times In Da Country (2006)

References

https://instagram.com/toyamartin

External links
 
 

1983 births
African-American women singer-songwriters
American musicians of Puerto Rican descent
Living people
Midwest hip hop musicians
Musicians from St. Louis
People from St. Louis County, Missouri
Singer-songwriters from Missouri
21st-century African-American women singers
Singer-songwriters from North Dakota